The Coronation of the Bohemian monarch  was a ceremony in which the king (or queen-regnant) and queen-consort (if there was one) were formally crowned, anointed, and invested with regalia. It was similar in form to coronation ceremonies in other parts of the Holy Roman Empire, in France, and in Hungary. As in France and England, the king's reign began immediately upon the death of his predecessor, especially after 1627.

Location of all coronations was St. Vitus Cathedral in Prague, from the time it was founded (except for the secular coronations of the earliest kings). The representative of the Church performing the coronation (consecrator) was the Archbishop of Prague as Primas Bohemiae. Until the archbishopric of Prague was established in 1344, the archbishop of Mainz had the privilege of crowning the king and queen of Bohemia (from 1228 to 1344). This right was derived from his position as Primas Germaniae of the Holy Roman Empire and ecclesiastical overlord of the Bohemian dioceses of Prague and Olomouc. During the Sede vacante of the archdiocese of Prague from 1421 to 1561, the position of consecrator was mostly filled by bishop of Olomouc (highest local Roman Catholic bishop after archbishop of Prague) or by foreign bishops. During coronation, the archbishop was assisted by two bishops (mostly from the lands of the Bohemian Crown).

The form of the coronation ceremony was prescribed in an order of coronation (ordo in Latin, korunovační řád in Czech) ordained by King Charles I (Charles IV, Holy Roman Emperor). It was based on an earlier Bohemian order of coronation (itself based on German coronation custom), and on the French coronation ceremony.

The first ruler (king) of Bohemia to be crowned was Vratislaus II of Bohemia. During the Middle Ages, it was held that enthronement would make a person Duke of Bohemia and that only coronation would make a person King of Bohemia. So coronations were held shortly after the accession of a new king. In the modern era, the new king ascended to the throne immediately after the death of his predecessor, and the coronation ceremony was held some time after his accession. The coronation church was St. Vitus Cathedral. Beginning in 1347, the monarchs of Bohemia were crowned with the Crown of Saint Wenceslas and invested with royal insignia, including a cap or mitre and a lance symbolic of Saint Wenceslas. Earlier coronation crowns have not been preserved.

Maria Theresa, the only female monarch of Bohemia, was crowned literally as king in order to emphasize that she was the monarch and not a consort. The last King of Bohemia to undergo a coronation were Emperor Ferdinand I of Austria (Ferdinand V as king of Bohemia) and his wife queen Maria Anna.

Most queen-consorts were crowned together with their husband, during the same ceremony, or one or more days after the coronation of the King. The first queen crowned alone was Elizabeth Richeza of Poland, the wife of Wenceslaus II, who was crowned on 26 May 1303 by the bishop of Wrocław. The last queen crowned in a separate coronation was Anna of Tyrol, wife of Matthias, on 10 January 1616.

The Abbess of St. George's Abbey had traditionally the privilege to assist archbishop with crowning of the wife of the King of Bohemia. St. George's Convent was abolished in 1782 and in 1791, the right to assist with crowning of the Queen of Bohemia was transferred to the Abbess of the neighbouring Theresian Institution of Noble Ladies (a post always filled by an Archduchess of Austria).

Coronation was not a prerequisite for exercising sovereign power in Bohemia, but all kings except seven were crowned. These were: 

 Wenceslaus III (ruled 1305–1306, short reign, murdered before coronation)
 Rudolf I of Bohemia (ruled 1306–1307, short reign, deposed)
 Henry of Bohemia (ruled 1307–1310, short reign, deposed)
 Joseph I (ruled 1705–1711, died before coronation)
 Joseph II (ruled 1780–1790, not crowned in Hungary either)
 Franz Joseph I (ruled 1848–1916, longest reigning king, coronation promised twice but never realized) 
 Charles III (ruled 1916–1918, short reign; state at war, deposed).

Coronation of the heir during life of his father sometimes occurred in the medieval and baroque period. King Ferdinand IV was crowned during the lifetime of his father (Ferdinand III), but died before him, so he never actually reigned. Other kings crowned during the reign of their predecessor were: Wenceslaus I of Bohemia, Wenceslaus IV of Bohemia, Louis, Maximilian, Rudolf II, Matthias , Ferdinand II, Ferdinand III, and Leopold I. Anti-king Charles Albert was not crowned during his short reign because the crown jewels were held by Maria Theresa. Charles Albert was proclaimed king in December 1741 by the bohemian nobility in the presence of the archbishop of Prague.

List of royal coronations

References

Bibliography

See also 

 Bohemian Crown Jewels
 List of Bohemian monarchs

Kingdom of Bohemia
Bohemia